Cold pack cheese, also known as club cheese or crock cheese, is a type of cheese spread that is created by blending natural cheeses without the use of heat.

Cold pack cheese was first made by a Wisconsin tavern owner for snacking. It is often made using Cheddar or Swiss cheeses as a base, using added spices, fruits, vegetables, or nuts as flavoring. Common flavorings include almonds, port wine, horseradish, and smoked flavor. However, a wide variety of cheeses may be used in creating this spread.

As with most cheese spreads, cold pack cheese is a soft spreadable blend of cheeses that can be used in a variety of applications. It can be used as an ingredient in sandwiches, on top of hot foods, such as potatoes, as a base for a cheese sauce, or simply on its own, served with crackers as an appetizer.

See also
 List of spreads

Notes

Processed cheese
Cuisine of Wisconsin